Federal court may refer to:

United States
 Federal judiciary of the United States
 United States district court, a particular federal court

Elsewhere
 Federal Court of Australia
 Federal courts of Brazil
 Federal Court (Canada)
 Federal courts (Germany)
 Federal Court of India, existed from 1937 to 1950
 Federal Court of Justice, Germany
 Federal Court of Malaysia
 Federal courts of Switzerland

See also
 Federalism (disambiguation)